The 1995 Crown Prince Cup was the 20th season of the Saudi premier knockout tournament since its establishment in 1957. The main competition started on 19 April and concluded with the final on 26 May 1995.

In the final, Al-Hilal defeated defending champions Al-Riyadh 1–0 to secure their second title and first since 1964. The final was held at the Prince Abdullah Al-Faisal Stadium in Jeddah for the third time. As winners of the tournament, Al-Hilal qualified for the 1996–97 Asian Cup Winners' Cup. As runners-up, Al-Riyadh qualified for the 1996 Arab Cup Winners' Cup.

Qualifying rounds
All of the competing teams that are not members of the Premier League competed in the qualifying rounds to secure one of 4 available places in the Round of 16. First Division sides Al-Nahda and Al-Shoulla and Second Division sides Al-Jabalain and Damac qualified.

Bracket

Round of 16
The draw for the Round of 16 was held on 15 April 1995. The Round of 16 fixtures were played on 19, 20 & 21 April 1995. All times are local, AST (UTC+3).

Quarter-finals
The draw for the Quarter-finals was held on 22 April 1995. The Quarter-finals fixtures were played on 27 & 28 April 1995. All times are local, AST (UTC+3).

Semi-finals
The draw for the Semi-finals was held on 29 April 1995. The Semi-finals fixtures were played on 18 & 19 May 1995. All times are local, AST (UTC+3).

Final
The 1995 Crown Prince Cup Final was played on 26 May 1995 at the Youth Welfare Stadium in Jeddah between Al-Hilal and Al-Riyadh. This was the third Crown Prince Cup final to be held at the stadium. This was Al-Hilal's second final and Al-Riyadh's second final as well. All times are local, AST (UTC+3).

Top goalscorers

References

External links
 Football competitions in Saudi Arabia 1994/95
 goalzz

Saudi Crown Prince Cup seasons
1995 domestic association football cups
Crown Prince Cup